Averasboro may refer to:

 Averasboro Township, Harnett County, North Carolina
 Battle of Averasborough, fought March 16, 1865